Haunted highways or roads refer to streets, roads or highways which are the subject of folklore and urban legends, including rumors and reports of ghostly apparitions, ghostly figures, phantom hitchhikers, phantom vehicles, repeating or looping highways, or other paranormal phenomena.

Legends

United States
 22 Mine Road, Holden, West Virginia: 22 Mine Road is reportedly haunted by the ghost of Mamie Thurman whose body was found murdered and dumped along the road June 22, 1932. 

 Annie's Road, Totowa, New Jersey: Annie's Road in New Jersey is supposedly haunted by the ghost of a woman killed on the road many years ago. It is located in Totowa on the first half of Riverview Drive.
 Boy Scout Lane, Wisconsin: a dead-end road with no outlet. A number of ghost stories and urban legends have become associated with the road, including the fictional deaths of a troop of Boy Scouts. The area has been the subject of several paranormal investigations, and has been a 'haunt' for local youths. However, there are no records of fatalities or mysterious disappearances on or around Boy Scout Lane.
 Bray Road Elkhorn, Wisconsin is infamously known for being the home of the Beast of Bray Road.
 Clinton Road in West Milford, Passaic County, New Jersey: the subject of local folklore that includes alleged sightings of ghosts, strange creatures and gatherings of witches, Satanists and the Ku Klux Klan. Supposedly, if a person visits one of the bridges at the reservoir and throws a penny into the water, within a minute it will be thrown back out to by the ghost of a boy who drowned while swimming below or had fallen in while sitting on the edge of the bridge. In some tellings an apparition is seen; in others the ghost pushes the teller into the water if he or she looks over the side of the bridge in order to save him.
 The Devil's Washbowl road in Moretown, Vermont is connected to a tale of pig-human hybrid entity known as the "Pigman".
 Edmonds Road, Jeremy Swamp Road, Marginal Road, Saw Mill City Road, Velvet Street & Zion Hill Road, Connecticut: Connecticut roads are connected to legends of Melon Heads, Saw Mill and Velvet are commonly referred to by residents as "Dracula Drive".
Jamestown Road in Jamestown, Guilford County, North Carolina, is the subject of local folklore regarding a vanishing hitchhiker known as "Lydia".
 Mount Misery Road and Sweet Hollow Road in the hamlet of West Hills in the Town of Huntington, New York are both subjects of local folklore, including but not limited to tales of Mary's Grave (supposedly located on a cemetery on Sweet Hollow Road), a ghostly police officer with the back of his head missing, and ghosts from a burned down mental asylum.
 Shades of Death Road

United Kingdom
 Flash Lane, Darley Moor: the quiet country lane near Darley Dale in Derbyshire is reputedly haunted by a headless horseman who was seen in the 1990s, along with supposed sightings of UFOs and 'Black Panthers' in the area. The nearby Darley Road is the location of several UFO sightings. It is reported that locals are afraid to use the road.
 Harewood Road, Holymoorside: the three mile lane linking Beeley Moor with the Derbyshire village of Holymoorside is reported to be haunted by phantom monks. Monks would be sent over from Beauchief Abbey to Harewood Grange, to work on the land, as a punishment for misbehaving. An uncomfortable atmosphere has also been reported in the area around the entrance to the abandoned Hunger Hill Pumping Station.
 A11 Thetford Bypass: the A11 dual carriageway Thetford bypass is reputedly haunted by a phantom gamekeeper appearing on car bonnets. Whilst waiting at a traffic light, one driver witnessed a car from the 1930s pass and vanish. The road has been known to unsettle passengers and drivers, creating a sense of lethargy.
 A21 Sevenoaks Bypass: the A21 Sevenoaks Bypass is reputedly haunted by ghostly sliproads which lead drivers into oncoming traffic and ultimately their deaths.
 A22 Caterham Bypass: on a certain section of the Caterham bypass, spectral females have been seen in the carriageway and crossing the road.
 A38 road, Somerset: according to legend, phantom hitchhikers have been reported since the 1950s on the A38 road between Wellington and Taunton in Somerset. One tale holds that in 1958 a lorry driver named "Harry (or "Harold" in some tellings) Unsworth" saw a hitchhiker he had given a ride to earlier re-appear miles down the road from where he had dropped him off.
 A61 Unstone-Dronfield Bypass: cars heading Northbound past Monk Wood are known to suddenly veer off down an embankment just a few feet before the crash barrier starts. The bypass is also believed to be haunted as a result of horrific fatal injuries sustained in accidents.
 A616 Stockbridge Bypass: the A616 road connects Manchester, to the M1 motorway. The section North of Sheffield is known as the Stocksbridge Bypass. During the bypass's construction, security staff allegedly reported encounters with phantom children dancing around an electricity pylon and a ghostly monk standing on Pea Royd Bridge who was believed to have been from the Hunshelf Priory.
 A75 road, Scotland: the A75, a major road in Scotland from Annan to Gretna Green, has been called Scotland's "most haunted road" by some authors. According to one story, in 1957 a truck driver swerved to avoid a couple walking in the road but when he stopped to investigate the pair had "vanished". Other versions of the stories tell of a couple or group of friends driving down the road at night and are constantly plagued and harassed by shadow figures, from an elderly woman to the back end of a semi truck that they nearly hit before braking only for it to disappear.

Europe
 A3 motorway, Croatia: the section of A3 motorway in Croatia between Staro Petrovo Selo and Nova Gradiška is believed to be haunted due to high number of accidents and paranormal encounters. It is a section where singer Toše Proeski and actress Dolores Lambaša lost their lives.
 Belchen Tunnel, Switzerland: sightings of an old woman dressed all in white who supposedly haunts the tunnel.

Asia
 E8 Expressway, Malaysia: the E8 Expressway, also known as the Kuala Lumpur–Karak Expressway, is reportedly "one of the most haunted highways in the world",. It is claimed that many people driving late at night see strange creatures, lost schoolboy, and Pontianak on this road. There is also sightings of a driverless yellow Volkswagen Beetle that appears from nowhere, that makes other drivers follow it to death.
 Chak Phra Road, Thailand: Chak Phra Road, a narrow two traffic lanes road along Khlong Chak Phra canal in Thonburi side of Bangkok, is reportedly the focus of a late 1970s urban legend about the ghost of a pregnant woman called "Phi Yai Wan" (ghost of Miss Wan). It was said that she was a local woman killed by her husband, and that her spirit had haunted people in many different ways, especially in front of Wat Taling Chan temple, which Chak Phra Road runs through. Various drivers, including taxi and tuk-tuk drivers, reportedly avoid it after sundown.
 Rama IX Road, Thailand: in 2016, a video by Thai journalist Powarit Katkul of a "ghost" on Rama IX Road in Bangkok went viral on social media.
 Ratchadapisek Road, Thailand: Ratchadapisek Road, an inner city ring road in downtown Bangkok. At the curved phase in front of the Criminal Court is often referred to as "Hundred-death Curve". Fatal accidents are frequent as driving vision is obscured by sacred fig tree on the median strip. Thais often place flowers and zebra statues at the curve all the way up to nearby footbridge to pay homage to the souls of the deceased, and drivers commonly honk when going through the curve in the road to ask the permission from the people who died there for safe passage.
 Ratchaprasong, Thailand: the four-corners of Ratchadamri, Rama I, and Ploenchit Roads in downtown Bangkok surrounded by a bustling shopping and commercial district, Ratchaprasong Intersection sits on the site of a former royal residence named Phetchabun Palace. Believed that this point must be cursed because it was obscured by the shadow of CentralWorld and several shrines were built to try and appease evil entities. The mostest famous and oldest shrine is the Erawan Shrine, dedicated to Phra Phrom, a Thai version of the Hindu four-faced God (Brahma). It is said that the Erawan Hotel at the corner of the intersection, when it was newly open, guests always saw spirits. Therefore, this place is an unsuitable position according to the beliefs of Thais since ancient times that the intersection is the passage of ghosts or spirits. Fortuneteller said many of the deadly events, such as the Great CentralWorld Fire in 2010, the 2015 bombings, and even more frequent road accidents, were caused by the actions of these spirits that still roam the area.
 Soi Vacharaphol, Thailand: Soi Vacharaphol is a soi (side-street) of Ram Inthra Road in Bang Khen, northern suburb Bangkok. It is a deep and lonely side-street. Around 1992, the atmosphere was filled with deserted fields and many abandoned houses, therefore, there are frequent crimes. There is a story about a European style house that is said to be a haunted house. Therefore, the construction was unsuccessful because it was hindered by ghosts and became a haunt of spirits. This side-street is often crowded with teenagers to hunting ghosts.
 Tha Chaom–Nong Chang Road, Thailand: a rural road between Ban Tha Chaom and Nong Chang District in Uthai Thani Province, central Thailand, it is reported to be haunted road. Many locals and monk, insist that they have seen a headless male ghost, including preta at night. In late June 2020, a couple drove past this road in the late night.
 Tuen Mun Road, Hong Kong: the Tuen Mun Road, one of Hong Kong's major expressways, is said by believers to be haunted. Many car accidents have been blamed by locals to the ghosts that suddenly appear along the middle of the expressway. Although authorities have cited narrow carriageways and substandard geometry (to save construction costs) as the reasons for these accidents, speed limits have been enforced for the expressway.
 Casablanca Tunnel, Indonesia: an underpass located in East Jakarta, Indonesia is one of the most reportedly haunted tunnels in the country and has become a famous urban legend among locals. Locals believe the tunnel was once a mass grave, and there are reported sightings of a pontianak who was raped and killed before the underpass was constructed. Passerby are usually advised to sound the horn at night to avoid any unwanted incident.
Bei Yi Highway, Taiwan: part of Provincial highway no. 9, Bei Yi Highway connects Taipei and Yilan County. The highway used to be a fatal road in Taiwan due to bad road conditions. Much ghost money (joss money) along the highway was a common sight in the past. The ghost money was scattered on the highway to appease the spirits. Recently, the highway has become the most popular heavy motorcycle route in Taipei, and the number of fatal accidents continues to increase.

Africa
 N9 road, South Africa: the road between Uniondale and Willowmore, in the semi-desert area of the Karoo, is the subject of a story of the "Uniondale Phantom Hitchhiker", a girl named "Marie Charlotte Roux" who allegedly died in a road accident on a particular stretch of the N9 on April 12, 1968 (Good Friday).

Australia
 Wakehurst Parkway, in Sydney, Australia is believed to be haunted by the ghost of a young woman named Kelly, and is said to be able to take control of vehicles that drive along the road at night. Crashes have also occurred along Wakehurst parkway in recent years.

See also
 
 List of ghosts

References

External links
Other cases in the UK
Stockbridge Bypass, Strange But True?
N9 South Africa Phantom Hitchhiker, Strange But True?
Ria Roux, the person in the N9, South Africa account

Lists of reportedly haunted locations
Types of roads